New Liberal Party may refer to:

New Liberal Party (Germany)
New Liberal Party (Israel), a defunct political party in Israel
New Liberal Party (2019 party), an active political party in Israel
New Liberal Party (New Zealand)
New Liberal Party (Nicaragua)
  (est. 2009)
New Liberal Party (Japan)

See also
Party of New Liberals